Harikrishna or Hari Krishna is an Indian name.  It may refer to:

 Nandamuri Harikrishna, Indian politician from the Telugu Desam Party in Andhra Pradesh and Telugu film actor
 Pentala Harikrishna, Indian chess player
 V. Harikrishna, music director and singer in the Kannada film industry
 Harikrishna Pathak, a Gujarati poet, short story writer, editor.
 Harikrishna Prasad Gupta, a poet

See also 
 Hare Krishna (disambiguation)

Indian given names